Hydrodynamic theory may refer to:
 Hydrodynamic theory (dentistry)
 Fluid dynamics, the theory of fluids in motion